The Saudi Arabia national women's cricket team is the team that represents Saudi Arabia in international women's cricket. In April 2018, the International Cricket Council (ICC) granted full Women's Twenty20 International (WT20I) status to all its members. Therefore, all Twenty20 matches played between Saudi Arabia women and other ICC members after 1 July 2018 will be a full WT20I. Saudi Arabia played their first official WT20I matches in March 2022 during the 2022 GCC Women's Gulf Cup.

Records and Statistics 

International Match Summary — Saudi Arabia Women
 
Last updated 25 March 2022

Twenty20 International 

T20I record versus other nations

Records complete to WT20I #1038. Last updated 25 March 2022.

See also
 List of Saudi Arabia women Twenty20 International cricketers

References

Women's
Women's national cricket teams
Cricket